The 2022–23 Sydney Sixers Women's season was the eighth in the team's history. Coached by Charlotte Edwards and captained by Ellyse Perry, the Sixers finished the regular season of WBBL08 in first position and set a new league record with eleven wins. They consequently qualified for their fifth Final appearance, returning to the knockout phase of the tournament for the first time since WBBL04. In the championship decider, held at North Sydney Oval, the Sixers were defeated in an upset by the Adelaide Strikers.

Squad 
Each 2022–23 squad was made up of 15 active players. Teams could sign up to five 'marquee players', with a maximum of three of those from overseas. Marquees were defined as any overseas player, or a local player who holds a Cricket Australia national contract at the start of the WBBL|08 signing period.

Personnel changes made ahead of the season included:

 Charlotte Edwards was appointed head coach of the Sixers, replacing Ben Sawyer.
 Indian marquees Shafali Verma and Radha Yadav did not re-sign with the Sixers.
 New Zealand marquee Suzie Bates signed with the Sixers, having previously played for the Perth Scorchers and Adelaide Strikers.
 English marquee Sophie Ecclestone signed with the Sixers, marking her first appearance in the league.
 Hayley Silver-Holmes departed the Sixers, signing with the Hobart Hurricanes.
 Angelina Genford signed with the Sixers, departing the Hobart Hurricanes.
 Kate Peterson signed with the Sixers, departing the Sydney Thunder.

The table below lists the Sixers players and their key stats (including runs scored, batting strike rate, wickets taken, economy rate, catches and stumpings) for the season.

Ladder

Fixtures 
All times are AEDT.
Regular season

Final

 Statistics and awards 
 Most runs: Ellyse Perry – 408 (2nd in the league) Highest score in an innings: Alyssa Healy – 107* (64) vs Perth Scorchers, 13 November 2022
 Most wickets: Ashleigh Gardner – 23 (equal 3rd in the league) Best bowling figures in an innings:
Sophie Ecclestone – 4/17 (4 overs) vs Adelaide Strikers, 15 October 2022
Kate Peterson – 4/17 (4 overs) vs Brisbane Heat, 16 November 2022
 Most catches (fielder): Ellyse Perry – 15 (1st in the league) Player of the Match awards:
 Ashleigh Gardner – 5
 Erin Burns, Alyssa Healy, Ellyse Perry – 2 each
 Suzie Bates – 1
 WBBL|08 Player of the Tournament: Ashleigh Gardner (1st), Ellyse Perry (5th), Alyssa Healy (equal 6th)''
 WBBL|08 Team of the Tournament: Erin Burns, Ashleigh Gardner, Alyssa Healy

References

Further reading

 

2022–23 Women's Big Bash League season by team
Sydney Sixers (WBBL)